Benji is a fictional dog in a series of films and a television series.
Benji may also refer to:

People
Abdessalam Benjelloun (born 1985), Moroccan association football player, nicknamed "Benji"
Andrew Veniamin (1975–2004), Melbourne underworld hitman, better known as "Benji"
Benjamin Benji Compton (born 1986), Spanish-British motorcycle speedway rider
Benjamin Benji Madden (born 1979), one of the twins in the band Good Charlotte
Benjamin Benji Marshall (born 1985), New Zealand rugby league footballer
Clive Benji Webbe (born 1967), singer of the reggae-metal band Skindred and formerly of Dub War
Le Quang Huy, better known as Benji (born 1997), Hungarian singer
Benji the Binman, nickname of Benjamin Pell (born 1963), British researcher for tabloid newspapers, known for sifting through celebrities' dustbins
Benjamin (Benji) Ungar (born 1986), American fencer
Benji Whelan, Irish Gaelic football manager

Films
 Benji (1974 film), the first film in a series of nine about the golden mixed breed dog named Benji
 Benji (2012 film), a documentary about the life and death of Chicago basketball player Ben Wilson
 Benji (2018 film), a reboot of the 1974 film

Other uses
Benji Village, Uttarakhand state, India
Benji (album), a 2014 studio album by the American indie folk act Sun Kil Moon
Benjamin Benji McHugh, a fictional character in UK soap opera Family Affairs
 Benjaminised Acol, variant of the Acol bidding system in contract bridge

See also
Benjy, a list of people and fictional characters with the given name or nickname
Benjy (film), a 1951 American short documentary film
Benjys, the first low-priced chain of sandwich shops in the United Kingdom

Masculine given names
Lists of people by nickname
Hypocorisms